Guðmundur Hólmar Helgason (born 5 August 1992) is an Icelandic handball player who currently plays for Selfoss and the Icelandic national team.

He was a member of the Icelandic national team roster for the 2016 European Men's Handball Championship

References

External links
Scoresway profile

1992 births
Gudmundur Holmar Helgason
Living people
Gudmundur Holmar Helgason
Expatriate handball players
Gudmundur Holmar Helgason